Joseph Marcel Luc Gauthier (born April 19, 1964) is a Canadian professional ice hockey scout and former player. He was born in Longueuil, Quebec. As a youth, he played in the 1975 and 1977 Quebec International Pee-Wee Hockey Tournaments with a minor ice hockey team from Longueuil. Gauthier played three games in the National Hockey League for the Montreal Canadiens, and played most of his career in the minor professional leagues.

Career statistics

References

External links

1964 births
Living people
Canadian ice hockey defencemen
Colorado Avalanche scouts
Flint Generals (IHL) players
French Quebecers
Fredericton Canadiens players
Ice hockey people from Quebec
Longueuil Chevaliers players
Montreal Canadiens players
Nashville Predators scouts
Pittsburgh Penguins scouts
Saginaw Generals players
Sherbrooke Canadiens players
Sportspeople from Longueuil
Undrafted National Hockey League players